The Second Battle of Breitenfeld was a major engagement of the Thirty Years' War between the Imperial Army of the Holy Roman Empire under Archduke Leopold Wilhelm of Austria and Ottavio Piccolomini, supported by Saxon troops, and the Swedish Army under Lennart Torstensson. It was the last battle of the war featuring more than 20.000 soldiers on each side and one of the rare occasions where both combatants were attacking.

The Swedish Army had been besieging the nearby Saxon fortress Leipzig but relieved it in face of the Imperial advance. The imperials interpreted the Swedish movements as an unorganized retreat because the Swedes had trickled out their troops to obtain a more favourable terrain. The imperial war council under the Archduke overruled Piccolomini's objections against battling an almost even-matched opponent in open field and ordered an attack. The Swedes awaited them in battle formation at Breitenfeld, the place of Gustavus Adolphus' famous victory in 1631.

Both armies used a linear formation with two wings of cavalry around the infantry in the center. The infantry was divided in two subgroups by both armies because of the woods that intersected the imperial lines. An early rout of the Madlo Arquebusier and most of the Saxon regiments at the imperial left wing allowed the Swedes to gain the upper hand on this side of the battle. The imperial right wing achieved similar success against the Swedish left until Torstensson sent large parts of his victorious right around the woods and behind the imperial center to attack the imperial right from the rear. They ultimately drove the imperials from the field, only the Leibregiments supported by Alt- and Neu-Piccolomini, Mislik, Borneval and Luttke resisted long enough to cover the retreat of the right group of the imperial center. The left group however was encircled and forced to surrender by the victorious Swedes.

Imperial-Saxon army 

There are essentially two different orders of battle for the Imperial-Saxon army. The one cited by William Guthrie mostly uses the information from the Theatrum Europaeum. According to Otto Rudert, this order of battle was the intended one but was changed shortly prior to the battle. Rudert and Arndt Preil instead use the Callenbergische Battaglia from the battle report of Colonel Kurt Reinecke von Callenberg. The Battaglia is meant to indicate the actual order of troops in battle and is used in this list.

Overall commanders were Archduke Leopold Wilhelm of Austria and Field-Marshal Ottavio Piccolomini. Unless otherwise noted, all units are German.

Left
Generalfeldwachtmeister Hans Christoph von Puchheim, 31 squadrons

First Echelon (Colonel Nicola Montard de Noyrel)
 Pompeij Cuirassier – Colonel Thomas Pompeji
 Madlo Arquebusier – Colonel Hans Georg Madlo
 Luigi Gonzaga Cuirassier – Major Khauts 
 Vorhauer Cuirassier – Colonel Hans Vorhauer
 Wintz Cuirassier – Colonel Christoph von Wintz
 Jung-Heister Cuirassier – Colonel Arnold von Heister
 Alt-Heister Cuirassier – Lieutenant Colonel Andreas Stahl
 Nicola Cuirassier  – Lieutenant Colonel Dominik Cadé
 Puchheim Cuirassier – Lieutenant Colonel Candido 

Second Echelon (Colonel Schleinitz)
 Burksdorf Cuirassier – Colonel Conrad Burksdorf
 Warlowsky Arquebusier – Colonel Peter Warlowsky
 Krafft zu Lammerstorf Cuirassier – Colonel Heinrich Krafft zu Lammerstorf
 Callenberg Saxon Cuirassier – Colonel Kurt Reinecke von Callenberg 
 Gall à Bourck Dragoons – Lieutenant Colonel Olivier Stephanson
 Knoche Saxon Cuirassier – Colonel von Knoche
 Gallas Dragoons – Lieutenant Colonel Johann Ablmont
 Schleinitz Saxon Cuirassier – Colonel von Schleinitz
Flankers
 8 squadrons of Croats and Cossacks

Center
Feldzeugmeister Ernst Roland von Suys, 11 brigades, 8 squadrons, 46 guns

Left Group (Feldzeugmeister Johann Barwitz von Fernemont and Generalfeldwachtmeister Anton von Weveld)
 Enkevort Infantry – Lieutenant Colonel Michael Thomb 
 Weveld Infantry – Lieutenant Colonel Simon Schrenk genannt Notzing
 Caretto di Grana Infantry – Lieutenant Colonel Paolo Pestaluzzi
 Sax-Lauenburg Infantry – Lieutenant Colonel Rohrscheid
 Moncada Infantry – Colonel Matteo Marchese di Moncada y Cardona
Right Group (Generalfeldwachtmeister Camillo Gonzaga)
 Suys Infantry (Walloon) – Lieutenant Colonel Eusebius von Crivelli
 Annibale Gonzaga Infantry – Lieutenant Colonel Valentin Hauser
 Ranfft Infantry – Colonel Johann Christoph Ranfft von Wiesenthal
 Archduke Leib Infantry – Lieutenant Colonel Gustav
 Fernemont Infantry – Lieutenant Colonel Nouskovsky
 Wachenheim Infantry – Colonel Otto Ludwig von Wachenheim
Reserve (Feldzeugmeister Suys)
 Archduke Leib – Colonel Sforza Marchese di Pallavicini
 Piccolomini Leib – Lieutenant Colonel Ghiselieri
 Grodetzky Arquebusier   – Colonel Georg Dietrich Grodetzky von Grodetz
 Gissenburg Cuirassier – Colonel Tobias von Gissenburg
 Desfours Cuirassier (Spanish-German) – Colonel Johann von Desfours
 Paconchay Dragoons – Colonel Martin de Paconchay

Right

Feldzeugmeister Annibale Gonzaga, 32 squadrons

First Echelon (Lieutenant Field Marshall Albert Gaston Spinola von Bruay)
 Mislik Cuirassier – Colonel Johann Sigmund von Mislik
 Alt-Piccolomini Cuirassier – Lieutenant Colonel Georg von Crespu 
 Bruay Cuirassier – Lieutenant Colonel Claus von Paumgarten
 Jung Cuirassier – Colonel Gottfried von Jung 
 Montecuccoli Cuirassier – Lieutenant Colonel Claudius Franz von Lannoy
 Sperreuter Cuirassier – Lieutenant Colonel Johann Walter
 Neu-Piccolomini Cuirassier – Colonel Paul  Béchamp
 La Corona Dragoons – Colonel Johann de la Corona
Second Echelon (Generalfeldwachtmeister Jacob Borneval d’Arlin)
 Spiegel Cuirassier – Lieutenant Colonel Lützelburg 
 Lüttke Cuirassier – Colonel Moriz von der Lüttke
 Wolframsdorf Cuirassier – Colonel Rudolph Georg von Wolframsdorf
 Kapaun Cuirassier – Colonel Albrecht Weikhard Kapaun von Swoykow
 Hanau Saxon Cuirassier – Generalfeldwachtmeister Augustin von Hanau
 Borneval Cuirassier – Lieutenant Colonel Dohna
 Munster Arquebusier – Colonel Christian von Münster
Flankers
 8 squadrons of Croats and Cossacks

Swedish army 
Field Marshal Lennart Torstensson

Right

Major general Arvid Wittenberg, major general Torsten Stålhandske, 24 squadrons, 13 detachments, 13 guns

First Echelon (Major general Wittenberg)
 Torstensson Leib Cuirassier
 Hesse Cuirassier
 Duval Cuirassier – Colonel Tobias Macdougall
 Hoking Cuirassier
 Kinsky Cuirassier
 Detachments: each regiment 40 musketeers and one light gun  
Second Echelon (Major general Stålhandske)
 Derfflinger Cuirassier
 Wittkopf Cuirassier – Colonel Johann von Wittkopf
 Helm Wrangel
 Polish Cuirassier

Center

Riksfälttygmästare Johan Lilliehöök, 11 brigades, 3 squadrons, 18 heavy and 23 light guns

Left Group (Major general Carl Gustaf Wrangel)
First Echelon
 C. G. Wrangel Infantry (Swedish-German)
 Mortaigne Infantry
Second Echelon
 Axel Lillie Infantry (Swedish-German) – Major general Axel Lillie
 Schlieben Infantry – Colonel Hans Heinrich von Schlieben
Right Group (Major general Kaspar Kornelius Mortaigne de Potelles)
First Echelon
 Lilliehöök Infantry
 Banér Infantry – Colonel Gustav Banér
Second Echelon
 Pfuhl Infantry
 Jeschwitski Infantry
Third Echelon Reserve
 Maul Infantry – Colonel William Maul
 Plettenberg Infantry
 Old Blue Infantry (Veteran)
 3 cavalry squadrons from different regiments

Left

Major general Erik Slang, major general Hans Christoff von Königsmarck, 24 squadrons, 16 detachments, 16 guns

First Echelon (Major general Slang)
 Stålhandske Cuirassier (Finn-German)
 Wittenberg Cuirassier (Finn-German)
 Cratzenstein Cuirassier
 Douglas Cuirassier – Colonel Robert Douglas
 Billinghausen Cuirassier
 Schulmann Cuirassier
 Pfuhl Cuirassier
 Mitzlaff Cuirassier
 Detachments: each regiment 40 musketeers and one light gun
Second Echelon (Major general Königsmarck)
 Seckendorf Cuirassier
 Tideman Cuirassier
 Lilliehöök Cuirassier

References

Sources 
 
 
 
 
 
 
 
 
 
 
 
 
 
 
 
 
 
 
 
 
 
 
 
 
 
 
 
 

Thirty Years' War orders of battle